Elisei Savvich Morozov (1798–1868) was the eldest son of Savva Vasilyevich Morozov of the Morozov dynasty. In 1837 he married Evdokiia Nikiforovna.

His father developed some wasteland on the right bank of the Klyazma River at a location which became Nikolskoye. In 1837, Elisei established a dye works next door but lost interest in the enterprise after becoming an Old Believer. As he became more interested in religion, he spent his time writing religious tracts while his wife, Evdokiia, ran the business.

References

1798 births
1868 deaths
Old Believers
Businesspeople from the Russian Empire